The Lewiston–Clarkston metropolitan area—colloquially referred to as the Lewiston–Clarkston Valley or Lewis–Clark Valley (often abbreviated as LC Valley), and officially known as the Lewiston, ID–WA Metropolitan Statistical Area—is a metropolitan area comprising Nez Perce County, Idaho and Asotin County, Washington. The metro is anchored by the cities of Lewiston, Idaho and Clarkston, Washington—named after  Meriwether Lewis and William Clark,  respectively. As of the 2010 census, the MSA had a population of 60,888 (though a July 1, 2011 estimate placed the population at 61,476), making it the 4th smallest metropolitan area in the United States.

Geography

Counties
Nez Perce County, Idaho
Asotin County, Washington

Communities
Anatone, Washington (unincorporated)
Asotin, Washington
Clarkston Heights-Vineland, Washington (unincorporated)
Clarkston, Washington
Culdesac, Idaho
Lapwai, Idaho
Lewiston, Idaho (Principal city)
Peck, Idaho
Spalding, Idaho (unincorporated)
West Clarkston-Highland, Washington (unincorporated)

Features 
Lewiston Hill
Lower Granite Lake
Snake River
Clearwater River (Idaho)
 Bridges
Interstate Highway Bridge
Southway Bridge
 Highways
U.S. Route 12 in Washington
U.S. Route 12 in Idaho
U.S. Route 95 in Idaho

Photos

Demographics
As of the census of 2000, there were 57,961 people, 23,650 households, and 15,803 families residing within the MSA. The racial makeup of the MSA was 93.01% White, 0.25% African American, 3.88% Native American, 0.60% Asian, 0.06% Pacific Islander, 0.55% from other races, and 1.66% from two or more races. Hispanic or Latino of any race were 1.94% of the population.

The median income for a household in the MSA was $34,903, and the median income for a family was $42,402. Males had a median income of $35,249 versus $24,616 for females. The per capita income for the MSA was $18,146.

See also
Idaho census statistical areas
Washington census statistical areas

Notes

References

 
Regions of Idaho
Regions of Washington (state)
Metropolitan areas of Idaho
Metropolitan areas of Washington (state)
Twin cities